US Post Office-Bath is a historic post office building located at Bath in Steuben County, New York.  It was built in 1931 and is one of a number of post offices in New York State designed by the Office of the Supervising Architect under James A. Wetmore. It is a two-story symmetrically massed brick structure with a one-story rear wing in the Colonial Revival style.  The front facade features a limestone pedimented portico supported by four Corinthian columns.  It is located within the Liberty Street Historic District.

It was listed on the National Register of Historic Places in 1988.

References

Bath
Colonial Revival architecture in New York (state)
Government buildings completed in 1931
Buildings and structures in Steuben County, New York
National Register of Historic Places in Steuben County, New York